Dapalis macrurus is an extinct species of prehistoric ray-finned fish. The only known site where it was found is the region around Céreste in the French Département Alpes-de-Haute-Provence,  Provence-Alpes-Côte d’Azur, south-west France. Dapalis macrurus was common in some pits, together with plant-fossils and some other fish-remains. Size was between 3 and 20 cm

Description

Distribution
Fossils of this species have been found in the Oligocene of France.

References
 Bony fish in the online Sepkoski Database
 The Paleobiology Database

External links
 The Fossil Forum
 Bajocen 14
 Mundo Fosil

Prehistoric perciformes
Taxa named by Louis Agassiz
Fish described in 1834
Serranidae